Peter Ebimobowei, commonly known as Ebi (born November 11, 1993), is a Nigerian footballer, who most recently played as a striker for Chittagong Abahani in Bangladesh Premier League. 

Peter joined Al-Ahly in January 2015 coming from Bayelsa United in Nigeria.

Honours

Club
Mağusa Türk Gücü
 KTFF Süper Lig: 2018–19

References

1993 births
Nigerian footballers
Living people
People from Bayelsa State
Mesaimeer SC players
Expatriate footballers in Qatar
Nigerian expatriates in Qatar
Al Ahly SC players
Egyptian Premier League players
Qatari Second Division players
Al-Mina'a SC players
Expatriate footballers in Iraq
Association football forwards